Brenda Kay Chamberlain,  (born April 9, 1952) was a member of the House of Commons of Canada, representing the riding of Guelph for the Liberal Party from 1993 until her resignation as of April, 2008.

Chamberlain was born in Toronto, Ontario. She was a home daycare owner and operator from 1979 to 1983, and served as the administrative assistant in a family-owned business from 1984 to 1987.  She also served as Executive Director of the Wellington County Literacy Council from 1989 to 1993, and of the Guelph-Wellington Career Educational Council from 1992 to 1993. During this time she also served on the Wellington County Board of Education (1985–1993).

Chamberlain sought the federal Liberal nomination in Guelph-Wellington in 1992. Chamberlain's main challenger for the nomination was to be former Liberal Member of Parliament Frank Maine, who represented Guelph in the House of Commons from 1974 to 1979.  Maine dropped out of the race after the riding's nomination meeting was scheduled for an early date, arguing that this favoured Chamberlain. Chamberlain went on to win the Liberal nomination by acclamation.  Maine later decided to run as an independent candidate against Chamberlain in the 1993 federal election.  Chamberlain was elected handily as the Liberals took all but one of Ontario's 101 seats—the closest any party has come to sweeping the country's biggest province at the federal level.

Chamberlain was re-elected by greater margins in the elections of 1997 and 2000.  For many years, she was known as a strong supporter of Paul Martin in his bid to succeed Jean Chrétien as leader of the Liberal Party.

Chamberlain won another easy victory in the election of 2004, defeating her Conservative opponent by nearly 10,000 votes in the redistributed riding of Guelph.

Chamberlain was elected a fifth time in the election of 2006, in which the Conservative Party won a national minority government.

She was one of the more socially conservative members of the Liberal caucus, and was a vocal opponent of her own party's plans to decriminalize the possession of small amounts of marijuana.  Chamberlain also voted against her party's same-sex marriage bill in 2005.  She was also involved in legislation which forced Bell Canada to revise its 411 billing policy.

Chamberlain served as parliamentary secretary to the Minister of Labour from 1997 to 1999, and was parliamentary secretary to the president of the Queen's Privy Council, with special emphasis on public service reform and Métis and Non-Status Indians, from December 2003 to July 2004.

Although opposition spread rumours that she was about to retire she stood for re-election in 2006 and won handily. Just over two years later, on March 7, 2008, Chamberlain announced her resignation from the House of Commons effective April 7.  She did not provide a reason for her resignation.  During that election and thereafter the Guelph Mercury subjected Chamberlain to increasing degrees of criticism. Hansard will show that Chamberlain's last official votes occurred during the finals of weeks of February 2008. Subsequently, a by-election was called to replace her. Frank Valeriote ran for the Liberal Party in Guelph. However, Prime Minister Stephen Harper called prior to the by-election date, rendering it moot. Frank Valeriote was elected as MP for Guelph in the general election.

She was elected for twenty-four consecutive years of public service.

Electoral record

References

External links
 

1952 births
Women members of the House of Commons of Canada
Liberal Party of Canada MPs
Living people
Members of the House of Commons of Canada from Ontario
Members of the King's Privy Council for Canada
People from Centre Wellington
Politicians from Toronto
Women in Ontario politics
21st-century Canadian politicians
21st-century Canadian women politicians